The 2009 Chicago Bears season was the franchise's 90th season overall in the National Football League. The Bears had looked to improve upon their 9–7 record from 2008 and return to the playoffs for the first time since the 2006 season, but failed to do so for the third consecutive season. The team finished 7–9, and third in the NFC North. This season was Lovie Smith's sixth season as the team's head coach. The Bears played all their home games at Soldier Field.

Offseason

2009 NFL Draft

Draft pick trades
In 2008, Tampa Bay traded its sixth-round selection to Chicago for quarterback Brian Griese.
In 2008, the Bears traded their seventh seventh-round selection to Tampa Bay for guard Dan Buenning.
In 2009, the Bears traded their 2009 first round pick (18th overall), their 2009 third round pick (84th overall), their 2010 first round pick and quarterback Kyle Orton for quarterback Jay Cutler and a 2009 fifth round pick (140th overall) from Denver originally belonging to Seattle.

Picks #99, #246 and #251 are compensatory draft picks.
 The Bears received picks #68 and #105 after a trade with Seattle for the Bears 2nd round pick at #49.

Departures
Marty Booker (released)
Gilbert Gardner (released)
Marcus Riley (waived)
Mike Brown (released)
John Tait (retired)
Terrence Metcalf (released)
Kyle Orton (traded)
Brandon Lloyd (released)

Additions

On December 30, 2008 the Bears signed DE Joe Clermond, LB Marcus Riley, WR Rudy Burgess, OT Cody Balogh, WR John Broussard, OG Tyler Reed, and TE Fontel Mines
 On February 3, 2009 the Bears signed QB Brett Basanez
 On February 27, 2009 just hours into free agency, the Bears agreed to a four-year contract with offensive lineman Frank Omiyale
 On March 11, 2009 the Bears signed unrestricted free agent free safety Josh Bullocks to a one-year contract. He previously played for the New Orleans Saints.
 On March 21, 2009 it was announced the Bears had signed safety Glenn Earl to a one-year contract.
 On March 25, 2009 the Bears agreed to terms with free agent tackle Kevin Shaffer
 On April 2, the Bears received Jay Cutler through a trade with the Denver Broncos.
On April 2, the Bears signed Orlando Pace to a three-year deal.
On May 11, the Bears signed tight end Michael Gaines to a one-year contract.
On May 29, the Bears signed Pisa Tinoisamoa to a one-year contract.
On September 1, the Bears signed Rod Hood who played in 2008 for the NFC Champion Arizona Cardinals
On October 19, defensive end Gaines Adams was traded to the Bears for a 2nd round draft pick in the 2010 NFL Draft.

Free agents

Coaching changes
The Bears hired former Detroit Lions head coach, Rod Marinelli, to be their defensive line and assistant head coach. Bob Babich became the linebackers coach again after Lloyd Lee was fired. However, Babich even though he is still the Defensive Coordinator was stripped of his play calling duties in favor of Head Coach Lovie Smith. Jon Hoke was hired as defensive backs coach.

Rosters

Opening training camp roster

Week 1 roster

Final roster

Staff

Schedule

Preseason

Regular season

Standings

Regular season

Week 1

    
    
    
    
    
    
    
    

The Bears began their season at Lambeau Field for a Sunday night battle with their hated rival, the Green Bay Packers.  After a scoreless first quarter, Chicago trailed early as Packers kicker Mason Crosby got a 52-yard field goal.  The Bears would respond with safety Danieal Manning sacking quarterback Aaron Rodgers in his own endzone for a safety, but Green Bay would respond as running back Ryan Grant got a 1-yard touchdown run.

Chicago would take the lead in the third quarter as quarterback Jay Cutler completed a 36-yard pass to wide receiver Devin Hester, along with kicker Robbie Gould making a 47-yard field goal.  Afterwards, the lead went back and forth in the fourth quarter.  Crosby would kick a 39-yard field goal, while Gould nailed a 21-yard field goal.  Afterwards, the Packers took the lead again as Rodgers completed a 50-yard touchdown pass and the following two-point conversion to wide receiver Greg Jennings.  The Bears tried to rally, but an interception ended any hope of a comeback.

With the loss, Chicago began its season at 0–1.

Cutler's 4 interceptions were the most he had thrown in one game of his career, until week 10 against the 49ers.

Week 2

    
    
    
    
    

Hoping to rebound from their Sunday night loss to the Packers, the Bears played their Week 2 home opener against the defending Super Bowl champions, the Pittsburgh Steelers. The Steelers took an early lead in the first quarter as quarterback Ben Roethlisberger completed a 1-yard TD pass to tight end Matt Spaeth, but the Bears immediately fired back in the second quarter as quarterback Jay Cutler completed a 7-yard TD pass to tight end Kellen Davis to tie the score 7–7.

In the third quarter, Pittsburgh retook the lead once more as Roethlisberger got a 2-yard run, but Chicago would rally in the fourth quarter as Cutler threw a 7-yard touchdown pass to rookie wide receiver Johnny Knox. The Steelers would then miss 2 field goal attempts, as the Bears drive the ball down to Steelers territory, ending the drive with kicker Robbie Gould's 44-yard field goal, to give the Bears the lead. The Steelers then fumbled the ball on the ensuing kickoff, ending any chance for a last second hail mary.

With this win, the Bears improved to 1–1.

Week 3

    
    
    
    
    
    
    
    
    

Coming off their home win over the Steelers, the Bears flew to Qwest Field for a Week 3 duel with the Seattle Seahawks.  Chicago would trail in the first quarter as quarterback Seneca Wallace completed a 39-yard touchdown pass to running back Julius Jones, followed by kicker Olindo Mare's 46-yard field goal.  Seattle would add onto their lead in the second quarter with Mare's 37-yard field goal, yet the Bears would answer with quarterback Jay Cutler's 1-yard touchdown pass to tight end Greg Olsen.

Chicago would take the lead in the third quarter with Cutler's 7-yard touchdown pass to rookie wide receiver Johnny Knox, followed by kicker Robbie Gould's 37-yard field goal.  The Seahawks would reply in the fourth quarter with Mare's 39-yard and 46-yard field goal, yet the Bears would prevail as Cutler completed a 36-yard touchdown pass to wide receiver Devin Hester, followed by a 2-point conversion pass to wide receiver Earl Bennett.  Afterwards, Chicago's defense would hold on for the win.

With the win, the Bears improved to 2–1.

Week 4

    
    
    
    
    
    
    
    
    
    
    
    

Coming off their road win over the Seahawks, the Bears went home for a Week 4 NFC North duel with the Detroit Lions.  Chicago surprisingly trailed early in the first quarter as Lions running back Kevin Smith got a 1-yard touchdown run.  The Bears would answer with quarterback Jay Cutler's 5-yard touchdown run, yet Detroit came right back with quarterback Matthew Stafford's 14-yard touchdown pass to tight end Will Heller.  Chicago would take the lead in the second quarter with Cutler's 2-yard touchdown pass to tight end Kellen Davis and a 1-yard touchdown pass to tight end Greg Olsen, yet the Lions would tie the game prior to halftime with Smith's 3-yard touchdown run.

The Bears would start the third quarter with a bang as rookie wide receiver Johnny Knox returned the half's opening kickoff 102 yards for a touchdown.  Later on, kicker Robbie Gould would add onto Chicago's lead with a 52-yard and a 22-yard field goal.  Detroit tried to rally in the fourth quarter with kicker Jason Hanson's 35-yard field goal, yet the Bears pulled away with running back Matt Forté's 37-yard touchdown run and running back Garrett Wolfe's 2-yard touchdown run.

With the win, Chicago would enter its bye week at 3–1.

Week 6

    
    
    
    
    

Coming off their bye week, the Bears flew to the Georgia Dome for a Week 6 Sunday night duel with the Atlanta Falcons.  Following a scoreless first quarter, Chicago delivered the game's opening strike in the second quarter with quarterback Jay Cutler completing a 23-yard touchdown pass to rookie wide receiver Johnny Knox.  However, the Falcons would respond with quarterback Matt Ryan hooking up with wide receiver Roddy White on a 40-yard touchdown pass and finding tight end Tony Gonzalez on a 10-yard touchdown.

After a scoreless third quarter, the Bears tied the game in the fourth quarter with Cutler hooking up with tight end Greg Olsen on a 2-yard touchdown pass.  However, Atlanta struck back with a 5-yard touchdown run from running back Michael Turner.  Cutler would get Chicago's offense deep into Falcon territory, but Atlanta's defense would spoil the comeback.

With the loss, the Bears fell to 3–2.

Week 7

    
    
    
    
    
    
    
    
    

Hoping to rebound from their Sunday night road loss to the Falcons, the Bears flew to Paul Brown Stadium for a Week 7 interconference duel with the Cincinnati Bengals.  Chicago would trail early in the first quarter as Bengals quarterback Carson Palmer found wide receiver Chris Henry on a 9-yard touchdown pass and wide receiver Chad Ochocinco on an 8-yard touchdown pass.  Things continued to get worse for the Bears as Palmer completed a 3-yard touchdown pass to tight end J.P. Foschi and an 8-yard touchdown pass to wide receiver Laveranues Coles, followed by a 29-yard field goal from kicker Shayne Graham.  Chicago would close out the half as kicker Robbie Gould booted a 22-yard field goal.

Afterwards, Cincinnati would pull away with Palmer finding Ochocinco again on a 13-yard touchdown pass in the third quarter and former Bears running back Cedric Benson getting a 1-yard touchdown run in the fourth quarter.  Chicago would end the game with quarterback Jay Cutler's 5-yard touchdown pass to wide receiver Devin Hester.

With the loss, the Bears fell to 3–3.

Week 8

    
    
    
    
    
    
    

Hoping to rebound from their horrendous road loss to the Bengals, the Bears went home for a Week 8 interconference duel with the Cleveland Browns.  Before the game, a pregame ceremony was held for the late Walter Payton, who died exactly 10 years ago on November 1.

Chicago got off to a fast start in the first quarter as kicker Robbie Gould made a 37-yard and a 29-yard field goal.  In the second quarter, the Bears would add onto their lead as Gould booted a 32-yard field goal, followed by running back Matt Forté got a 1-yard touchdown run.  In the third quarter, the Browns would get onto their board with a 1-yard touchdown run by quarterback Derek Anderson (with a blocked PAT).  Afterwards, Chicago would continue their dominating day with a 10-yard touchdown run by Forté.  The Bears would then close out the game in the fourth quarter with cornerback Charles Tillman returning an interception 21 yards for a touchdown.

With the win, Chicago improved to 4–3.

Week 9

    
    
    
    
    
    
    
    
    
    

Coming off their win over the Browns, the Bears stayed at home for a Week 9 duel with the Arizona Cardinals.  Chicago would trail early in the first quarter as Cardinals quarterback Kurt Warner hooked up with wide receiver Larry Fitzgerald on an 11-yard touchdown pass.  The Bears would answer as quarterback Jay Cutler competed a 33-yard touchdown pass to tight end Greg Olsen, but Arizona came right back as Warner hooked up with tight end Ben Patrick on a 6-yard touchdown pass.  Chicago would find themselves in a huge deficit in the second quarter as Warner completed a 17-yard touchdown pass to Fitzpatrick and a 15-yard touchdown pass to tight end Anthony Becht, followed by kicker Neil Rackers nailing a 43-yard field goal.

The Cardinals would add onto their lead as Rackers booted a 30-yard field goal in the third quarter.  The Bears tried to rally in the fourth quarter as Cutler connected with Olsen on a 3-yard and a 20-yard touchdown pass, but Arizona pulled away with Warner completing a 4-yard touchdown pass to wide receiver Steve Breaston.

With the loss, Chicago fell to 4–4.

Week 10

    
    
    
    

Hoping to rebound from a miserable home loss to the Cardinals, the Bears flew to Candlestick Park for a Week 10 Thursday night duel with the San Francisco 49ers, led by head coach Mike Singletary (former Bears linebacker).

After a scoreless first quarter, Chicago would trail in the second quarter as 49ers running back Frank Gore got a 14-yard touchdown run.  The Bears would close out the half with a 50-yard field goal from kicker Robbie Gould.  In the third quarter, Chicago would inch closer with Gould's 38-yard field goal.  In the fourth quarter, San Francisco would answer with kicker Joe Nedney making a 21-yard field goal.  The Bears would get have a late game drive go deep into 49er territory, but an interception by safety Michael Lewis ended any hope of a win.

With the loss, the Bears fell to 4–5.

Quarterback Jay Cutler (29/52 for 307 yards) would throw for a career-worst 5 interceptions in one game.

Week 11

Week 12

Week 13

Week 14

Week 15

Week 16

Week 17

References

External links

2009 Chicago Bears season at Pro Football Reference
2009 Chicago Bears season at ESPN

Chicago Bears seasons
Chicago Bears
Bear
2000s in Chicago
2009 in Illinois